Glyphodes actorionalis is a moth in the family Crambidae. It was described by Francis Walker in 1859. It is found in Zambia, India and Indonesia (the Moluccas, Sulawesi).

References

Moths described in 1859
Glyphodes